Elena Valeryevna Chalova (born 16 May 1987) is a retired Russian tennis player.

Elena Chalova was born to Valeri Chalov and Irina Chalova, and has a brother named Michael. She started played tennis at the age of seven.

On 9 November 2009, she reached her career-high singles ranking of world No. 151. On 14 June 2010, she peaked at No. 133 in the doubles rankings.

ITF finals

Singles: 11 (8–3)

Doubles: 21 (9–12)

References

External links
 
 

1987 births
Living people
Russian female tennis players
Sportspeople from Ufa
20th-century Russian women
21st-century Russian women